Thomas Felton may refer to:
Thomas Felton (KG) (died 1381), fought at the Battle of Crecy, and the capture of Calais
Thomas Felton (martyr) (1567–1588), English martyr
Sir Thomas Felton, 4th Baronet (1649–1709), English politician
Tom Felton (born 1987), English actor and musician